Johnnie E. Hines (February 4, 1901 – September 6,1967), nicknamed "Jackhouse", was an American Negro league baseball player. He played for the Chicago American Giants between 1924 and 1934. "World's Champions 1926 and 1927 and winners of first half 1928 Negro National League Chicago American Giants."

References

External links
 and Seamheads

Year of birth missing
Chicago American Giants players
People from Birmingham, Alabama